Hopelawn is an unincorporated community located within Woodbridge Township in Middlesex County, New Jersey, United States.

Demographics

History
Hopelawn was the homestead and farm of Luther M. Hope in the 19th century. After its establishment, the original streets were named after Luther Hope's children (Juliette, Loretta, May, Luther, Lee, Warren, James, Howard, Clyde, John, Ellen, Charles, Herbert, Erin, Emmitt, William). Originally called Hope's Lawn, it was later shortened to Hopelawn.

Luther Martin Hope, who was born at Modestown, Virginia, June 9, 1839, and came as a young man to Brooklyn, New York, and then to Perth Amboy, New Jersey.

For many years he carried on a mercantile business in Perth Amboy, but during the latter years of his life retired and made his home on what was then known as the old Billy Watson's farm, now "Hopelawn," in Perth Amboy, his death occurring there January 25, 1907.

Hopelawn was originally two communities Ellendale Terrace from May Street south to New Brunswick Avenue and Hopelawn from May Street north to West Pond Road sections such as Washington Heights, the area of Pennsylvania Avenue and Garden State Parkway and Florida Grove along Florida Grove Rd. from West Pond Road to Lee Street.

Hopelawn was famous for its abundance of high quality clay. The Such Clay Company and the McHose Clay Company extracted clay from the area south of New Brunswick Avenue, west of Florida Grove Road, from Hopelawn to Keasbey. This area was referred to as "The Clay Banks". The Clay Banks contained several "Old Fashion Swimming Holes" and "Fishing Ponds" as well as the only baseball field in town until the baseball field next to #10 School was built in the late 1940s.

There were two sets of railroad tracks that crossed the Hopelawn Clay Banks, east to west. The rail line originated in Pennsylvania and terminated in Perth Amboy and was operated by the Lehigh Valley Railroad. The right-of-way became part of the Middlesex Greenway.

In the late 1930s and 1940s, Hopelawn was the home of a Semi Pro Football team known as the "Hopelawn Greyhounds". The games against the "Woodbridge Golden Bears" were legendary. The team disbanded because of World War II. After the war many of the "Greyhound" (Maroon and Grey) players joined and went on to star with the "Golden Bears" (Gold and Black) owned and coached by Tony Caceola.

Mary C. Fee, teacher and school principal, served the residents of Hopelawn from 1919-1969 at Hopelawn's only school, Elementary School #10. After her retirement a street was named in her honor, Mary C. Fee Lane, adjacent to the school.  The school is no longer in operation. A library in the basement of the building remained until the property was purchased and sold in the 1990s. The building is now a functioning church.

Although Hopelawn is within the borders of the Township of Woodbridge, it uses the same ZIP Code, 08861, as the neighboring City of Perth Amboy.

Hopelawn Volunteer Engine Co. #1 

Hopelawn Engine Co. No. 1 was organized December 3, 1914, as the Hopelawn Fire Department No. 1.

The first headquarters was in Ed O'Brien's barber shop on Florida Grove Road and the equipment was one dozen buckets. The first fire, a few weeks after organizing, was about a half mile at Al Black's farm, All the members responded, running with their buckets to put out the hay barn fire. Buckets were used until 1916 when the Fords fire commissioners purchased a chemical wagon which was pulled by manpower

The next fire was at the McHose building on the corner of Florida Grove Road and New Brunswick Avenue, and the firemen were able to save the building.

New equipment was purchased and housed in Barrett's barn on the corner of Florida Grove Road- and May Street. An alarm system consisting of a locomotive wheel and hammer was also set up at this site. In 1918 lots were purchased at the on the corner of May and Charles Streets and the building was erected in 1921. Hopelawn's first fire chief was John Jancisko.

The Hopelawn First Aid Squad was organized in 1937 by the Hopelawn Engine Co #1.

Notable people
People who were born in, residents of, or otherwise closely associated with Hopelawn include:
Lou Creekmur, a 1996 inductee of the Pro Football Hall of Fame in Canton, Ohio. Creekmur played for Woodbridge High School, College of William and Mary, and for ten years as an offensive lineman with the Detroit Lions. He was selected to play in eight Pro Bowls. Creekmur was also a radio broadcaster for the Miami Dolphins.

See also
List of neighborhoods in Woodbridge Township, New Jersey
List of neighborhoods in Edison, New Jersey

References

Neighborhoods in Woodbridge Township, New Jersey
Unincorporated communities in Middlesex County, New Jersey
Unincorporated communities in New Jersey